Leander Kahney (born 25 November 1965) is a technology writer and author.  He is a former managing editor, and previously a senior reporter, at Wired News, the online sister publication of Wired.

Career
He is also the author of five books centered on the subculture surrounding Apple products, as well as the company itself: The Cult of Mac, Cult of iPod, Inside Steve's Brain, Jony Ive — The Genius Behind Apple’s Greatest Products, and  Tim Cook - The Genius Who Took Apple To The Next Level.

Kahney is currently best known for his role as editor and publisher of a popular Apple-centric blog, also titled Cult of Mac.  As a prominent writer on Apple- and Mac-related topics, Kahney was once theorized (incorrectly) to be the identity of Fake Steve Jobs.

Leander has worked for many other publications, including: MacWeek as a senior reporter, Scientific American, The Observer and The Guardian in London.  Working as a newspaper reporter in the UK, he covered amongst other things, the war in former Yugoslavia.

References

1965 births
British male journalists
Living people
People from San Francisco
20th-century British journalists
21st-century British journalists